Duke of Connaught and Strathearn was a title in the Peerage of the United Kingdom that was granted on 24 May 1874 by Queen Victoria of the United Kingdom of Great Britain and Ireland to her third son, Prince Arthur. At the same time, he was also granted the subsidiary title of Earl of Sussex.

History
By tradition, members of the sovereign's family received titles associated with England, Scotland, Ireland and Wales, the four Home Nations that made up the United Kingdom of Great Britain and Ireland. The Dukedom of Connaught and Strathearn was named after one of the four provinces of Ireland, now known by its modern Irish language-based spelling of Connacht. It was seen as the title that, if available, would henceforth be awarded to the British monarch's third son. The first son is the Duke of Cornwall (in England) and Duke of Rothesay (in Scotland), and would be made Prince of Wales at some point, while the second son would often become Duke of York, if the title was available.

Since the exit of the Irish Free State from the United Kingdom in 1922, titles related to locations in the Free State (and later the Republic of Ireland) have not been awarded (though Prince Edward, Prince of Wales—in 1936 briefly King Edward VIII—was made a Knight of the Order of St Patrick). However, territorial titles relating to Northern Ireland have continued to be awarded.

After Prince Arthur's death in 1942, the title was inherited by his grandson, Alastair. In the absence of any male heirs, the dukedom became extinct when Alastair died, 15 months after his grandfather.

A Canadian military regiment, The British Columbia Regiment (Duke of Connaught's Own), is a Canadian armoured regiment in the 1st Duke's name. A British Indian Army cavalry regiment, the 6th Duke of Connaught's Own Lancers (Watson's Horse), was also named for the 1st Duke.

Dukes of Connaught and Strathearn (1874)

Family tree

Possible future creations
The Dukedom is currently vacant. While there were some speculations that it was one of the options available for Prince Harry upon his wedding with Meghan Markle, press reports have also noted that Connaught is now part of the Republic of Ireland, as well as the supposed manner in which the last Duke of Connaught and Strathearn died, thus making it unsuitable.

Strathearn is a subsidiary Earldom in the Dukedom of Cambridge.

See also
Earl of Connaught (subsidiary title of the Duke of Gloucester and Edinburgh)
Connaught Place, New Delhi, the commercial centre of India's capital.
Connaught Place, London, on the south end of Edgware Road, very close to the Marble Arch and Hyde Park.
Taman Connaught, Kuala Lumpur
Connaught Place (Hong Kong)
Connaught, Ontario
Connaught Road, Hong Kong
Connaught Square, London
The Connaught (hotel), London
O'Conor Don, the ancient Gaelic Royal Family of Connacht

References

External links
Memorial Site for the Duke of Connaught, Governor General of Canada
www.Duke100th.com  Duke of Connaught Public School, Toronto, Ontario, Canada - 100th Anniversary

Extinct dukedoms in the Peerage of the United Kingdom
1874 establishments in the United Kingdom
 
Noble titles created in 1874